José Eduardo Franco (born 1969 in Ribeira Grande, Machico) is a Portuguese historian, journalist, poet and essayist. He has served as a lecturer at the University of the Azores, the University of Lisbon, the University of the Algarve, and the University of Coimbra. His writings focus on the history of Madeira, the Azores, and the Portuguese diaspora, as well as contemporary political and social issues.

Biography

Institutions
José Eduardo Franco has developed original research works in the areas of Portuguese mythology and the great historical controversies that marked the cultural, political and religious life of Portugal. He has studied history of the Jesuits, particularly the antijesuitic phenomenon and the hermeneutic of myths and Portuguese and European utopias. He is also a columnist in the periodical press, with articles published in the areas of History, Mythocriticism, Culture, Philosophy and Religion Sciences Hermeneutics, Sciences of Education and Women's History. Besides his research work and project coordination, he has organized international scientific congresses, such as the International Congress Father Manuel Antunes: Interfaces of Portuguese and European Cultures (2005), the International Congress Gardens of the World: Discourses and Practices (2007), the International Congresso of Religious Orders and Congregations in Portugal (2010), the Council of Trento: Restore or Innovate - 450 years of History (2013), and the I International Symposium History, Culture and Science from/of Madeira, with the theme What Knowledge(s) for the XXI Century? (2014). From 2012 until 2015, he was the Director of the CLEPUL (Centre for Lusophone and European Literatures and Cultures of the Faculty of Letters of the University of Lisbon), and until 2012, he was the President of the Board of the European Institute of Cultural Sciences Father Manuel Antunes (institution associated with the Faculty of Letters of the University of Lisbon, in partnership with ESAD - Ricardo Espírito Santo Silva Foundation), where he founded and coordinated the degrees in Cultural Sciences. Until 2011, he was the Vice-President of the International Society for Iberian-Slavonic Studies. Until 2020, he was director of CIDH - FCT Invited Chair Infante Dom Henrique for Atlantic Island Studies and Globalization (Aberta University/Pole of CLEPUL - Centre for Lusophone and European Literatures and Cultures of the Faculty of Letters, University of Lisbon). 

He is currently a Full Professor at the Aberta University, where he is the director of the Chair for Global Studies (CIPSH Chair - Conseil International de la Philosophie et des Sciences Humaines), and is a member of the Portuguese Academy of History.

Research projects
Author and co-director of the project Dicionário Histórico das Ordens e Instituições Afins em Portugal [Historical Dictionary of Religious Orders and Related Institutions in Portugal], funded by the Foundation for Science and Technology (FCT) (2010).
Coordinator of the research project entitled “Documentos sobre a História da Expansão Portuguesa existentes no Arquivo Secreto do Vaticano” [Documents of the History of Portuguese Expansion from the Vatican Secret Archives], funded by the Foundation for Science and Technology (FCT) and promoted by the Centre of Studies of Peoples and Cultures of Portuguese Expression – UCP (2011).
Member of the coordinating committee of the project for the critical edition of Obra Completa do Padre Manuel Antunes, SJ [The Complete Works of Father Manuel Antunes, SJ], published by the Calouste Gulbenkian Foundation (2012).
Coordinator of the project “Vieira Global” (with Pedro Calafate), which includes The Complete Works of Father António Vieira - published by Círculo de Leitores in 2013-2014  a multimedia Dictionary of Father António Vieira and the edition of the selected works of Vieira, translated in 12 international large-circulation idioms (2012-).
Coordinator of the Dicionário Enciclopédico da Madeira [Encyclopedic Dictionary of Madeira] (2012-).
Coordinator of the project for the critical edition of The Complete Works of the Marquis of Pombal (with Pedro Calafate and Viriato Soromenho-Marques) (2013-).
Coordinator of the project Pioneer Works of Portuguese Culture (with Carlos Fiolhais) (2015-2019).

Partial bibliography
His published works include:
Vieira na Literatura Anti-Jesuítica, (co-authorship with Bruno Cardoso Reis), Lisbon, Roma Editora, 1997;
O Mito do Milénio, (co-authorship with José Manuel Fernandes) Lisbon, Paulinas, 1999;
Teologia e Utopia em António Vieira, insert of the journal Lusitania Sacra, Lisbon, 1999;
Brotar Educação, Lisbon, Roma Editora, 1999;
Falésias da Utopia, Lisbon, Editora Arkê, 2000;
História dos Dehonianos em Portugal, Oporto, Edições Dehonianas, 2000;
O Mito de Portugal, Lisbon, Roma Editora, 2000 (Awarded with the First Prize of “Livro 2004” of the Historic Society of the Portuguese Independence);
Monita Secreta (Instruções Secretas dos Jesuítas). História de um manual conspiracionista, (co-authorship with Christine Vogel) Lisbon, Roma Editora, 2002;
Fé, Ciência e Cultura. Brotéria – 100 anos, Coordination in partnership with Hermínio Rico, Preface by Eduardo Lourenço, Lisbon, Gradiva, 2003;
O mito do Marquês de Pombal, (co-authorship with Annabela Rita), Lisbon, Prefácio, 2004;
Metamorfoses de um povo: Religião e Política nos Regimentos da Inquisição Portuguesa – with complete edition of Regimentos da Inquisição Portuguesa, (co-authorship with Paulo de Assunção), Lisbon, Prefácio, 2004;
Influência de Joaquim de Flora em Portugal e na Europa. With the edition of Natália Correia's writings about “Utopia da Idade Feminina do Espírito Santo” , (co-authorship with José Augusto Mourão), Lisbon, Roma Editora, 2004;
Dois exercícios de Ironia: “Contra os Jesuítas” de Sena Freitas and “Defesa da Carta Encíclica de Sua Santidade o Papa Pio IX” de Antero de Quental, (co-authorship with Prof. Luís Machado de Abreu), Lisbon, Prefácio, 2005;
Coordination of the edition of the unpublished manuscript of the Tratado do Quinto Império em Portugal (Treaty of the Fifth Empire in Portugal). With the complete edition of the Treaty of the Fifth Monarchy by Sebastião de Paiva, Preface by Arnaldo Espírito Santo, Lisbon, Imprensa Nacional – Casa da Moeda, 2006;
O Mito dos Jesuítas em Portugal e no Brasil, Séculos XVI-XX, 2 Vols., Lisbon, Gradiva, 2006–2007;
Padre Manuel Antunes (1918–1985): Interfaces da Cultura Portuguesa e Europeia, Work coordinated in partnership with Hermínio Rico, Oporto, Campo das Letras, 2007;
Jesuítas e Inquisição: cumplicidades de confrontações, Rio de Janeiro, Editora da Universidade Estadual do Rio de Janeiro, 2007;
O Padre António Vieira e as Mulheres: Uma visão barroca do Universo feminino, (co-authorship with Isabel Morán Cabanas), Oporto, Campo das Letras, 2008;
Padre António Vieira (1608–1697): Imperador da Língua Portuguesa, Coordination and co-authorship, Lisbon, Correio da Manhã, 2008;
Jardins do Mundo: Discursos e Práticas, Co-coordination with Cristina da Costa Gomes, Lisbon, Gradiva, 2008;
Madeira -  mito da ilha-jardim: cultura da regionalidade ou da nacionalidade imperfeita na Madeira, Lisbon, Gradiva, 2009;
Holodomor – The Unknown Ukrainian Tragedy (1932-1933), Author and co-director, Coimbra, Grácio Editor, 2013;
Jesuítas, Construtores da Globalização, Co-authored with Carlos Fiolhais, CTT, 2016;
Portugal Católico, Lisbon, Temas e Debates, 2017.
Dicionário dos Antis: Cultura Portuguesa em Negativo, Lisbon, INCM, 2018;
Madeira Global: Grande Dicionário Enciclopédico da Madeira - Volume 1, coordinated with Cristina Trindade, Lisbon, Theya, 2019;
A Europa ao Espelho de Portugal, Lisbon, Temas e Debates, 2020
História Global de Portugal, co-authored with José Pedro Paiva and Carlos Fiolhais, Lisbon, Temas e Debates, 2020

References

External links
O Mito de Portugal, José Eduardo Franco, Lisboa, Roma Editora, 2000.

1969 births
Living people
Cultural historians
20th-century Portuguese historians
21st-century Portuguese historians
Academic staff of the University of Lisbon